Grand Avenue may refer to:

Places

Roadways
Grand Avenue, Baldwin, Nassau County, New York
Grand Avenue (Chicago), Illinois
Grand Avenue, Coconut Grove, Miami
Grand Avenue, Detroit, Michigan
Grand Avenue, Freeport, New York
Grand Avenue (Los Angeles)
Grand Avenue, Minneapolis, Minnesota
Grand Avenue (Phoenix)
Grand Avenue, Portland, Oregon, part of Oregon Route 99E
Grand Avenue (Queens), New York City
Grand Avenue, Saint Louis, Missouri
Grand Avenue, Saint Paul, Minnesota
Grand Avenue, Springfield, Illinois
Grand Avenue, West Worthing, England

Other places
Grand Avenue Project, a redevelopment project along Grand Avenue in Los Angeles
Shops of Grand Avenue, a shopping mall in downtown Milwaukee, Wisconsin

Arts, entertainment, and media
Grand Avenue (band), a Danish rock band
Grand Avenue, a comic strip written by Steve Breen
Grand Avenue (film), a 1996 American drama film

New York City Subway
Grand Avenue (BMT Fulton Street Line), demolished
Grand Avenue (BMT Myrtle Avenue Line), demolished
Grand Avenue–Newtown (IND Queens Boulevard Line), serving the M R trains

See also
Grand Boulevard (disambiguation)
Grand Street (disambiguation)